These are the public holidays observed in Ireland. Public holidays in Ireland (as in other countries) may commemorate a special day or other event, such as Saint Patrick's Day or Christmas Day. On public holidays (sometimes incorrectly referred to as bank holidays), most businesses and schools close. Other services, for example, public transport, still operate but often with reduced schedules.

The ten public holidays in Ireland each year are as follows:

Where a public holiday falls on a Saturday or a Sunday, or possibly coincides with another public holiday, it is generally observed (as a day off work) on the next available weekday, even though the public holiday itself does not move. In such cases, an employee is entitled to at least one of the following (as chosen by the employer): a day off within a month, an additional day's paid annual leave or an additional day's pay. The usual practice is, however, to award a day off on the next available weekday.

History
The United Kingdom Bank Holidays Act 1871 established the first Bank holidays in Ireland. The act designated four Bank holidays in Ireland: 
Easter Monday
Whit Monday
First Monday in August
Saint Stephen's Day

As Good Friday and Christmas Day were traditional days of rest and Christian worship (as were Sundays), therefore it was felt unnecessary to include them in the act as they were already recognised as common law holidays.

In 1903, Saint Patrick's Day became an official public holiday in Ireland. This was due to the Bank Holiday (Ireland) Act 1903, an Act of the United Kingdom Parliament introduced by the Irish MP James O'Mara.

In 1939, the Oireachtas passed the Holidays (Employees) Act 1939 which designated the public holidays as: 
Saint Patrick's Day
Easter Monday
Whit Monday
First Monday in August
Christmas Day
Saint Stephen's Day

The Holidays (Employees) Act 1973 replaced the Whit Monday holiday with the first Monday in June. New Year's Day was not listed in the Act but was added by Statutory instrument in 1974. The October Holiday was added in 1977. The first Monday in May (commonly known as May Day) was added in 1993 and first observed in 1994.

The Organisation of Working Time Act 1997, among other things, transposed European Union directives on working times into Irish law. Schedule 2 of the Act specifies the nine public holidays to which employees in Ireland are entitled to receive time off work, time in-lieu or holiday pay depending on the terms of their employment.

In 2022 only, Friday 18 March was a public holiday, to recognise the efforts of the country during the COVID-19 pandemic. 

In 2023, Imbolc/Saint Brigid's Day became a public holiday, to mark both the saint's feast day and the seasonal festival. It is observed on the first Monday of February, or on 1 February if it falls on a Friday. A government statement noted that it is the first Irish public holiday named after a woman, and "means that all four of the traditional Celtic seasonal festivals will now be public holidays".

Once-off public holidays
The power to introduce an additional public holiday is provided for in the Organisation of Working Time Act 1997 and the Minister for Enterprise, Trade and Employment may introduce a new public holiday by regulation. To date, three once-off public holidays have been introduced under the Act via Statutory Instrument. These were:

School holidays

Primary schools

 In Ireland the academic year in primary schools lasts from late August to late June. 
 The academic year is composed of 183 schooldays and schools are not open in July or August (though for flexibility school may open for the last two/three days of August).
 The first mid-term break is always the last week of October (also called the Halloween break).
 Most Catholic schools previously closed for the Feast of the Immaculate Conception on 8 December, but however this has stopped.
 The Christmas break lasts from the last school day before 23 December to the first weekday after 6 January (17–21 days).
 The second mid-term break is a minimum of two days to a maximum of five days duration taken in the third week of February (also called the Shrove break).
 The Easter break consists of a week before Easter to the 2nd Monday after Easter (10 school days or 16 days inclusive).
 In the last term holidays are flexible and are generally arranged around the public holidays in May and June.

Secondary schools
 In Ireland the academic year in secondary schools is composed of 167 school days and lasts from late August to early June.
 The first mid-term break begins on the last weekend before 31 October and lasts for one week.
 Many Catholic schools used to close for the Feast of the Immaculate Conception on 8 December but this however has stopped nationwide.
 The Christmas break lasts from the last school day before 23 December to the first weekday after 6 January (10 school days or 15–18 days inclusive).
 The second mid-term break begins on the last school day in the second week of February and lasts for one week.
 The Easter break consists of a week before Easter to the second Monday after Easter (10 school days or 16 days inclusive).
 The school year ends on the Friday before the June public holiday.
 The state examinations (the Junior and Leaving Certificate examinations) begin the Wednesday after the June Holiday.

See also
Irish calendar
Public holidays in the United Kingdom for Northern Ireland

References

External links
Public holidays in Ireland – Citizens Information website

 
Ireland
Holidays